The bisexual community, also known as the bi+, m-spec, bisexual/pansexual, or bi/pan/fluid community, includes members of the LGBT community who identify as bisexual, pansexual, omnisexual, polysexual and sexually fluid. As opposed to hetero- or homosexual people, people in the bisexual community experience attraction to more than one gender.

Defining the community 

The bisexual community includes those who identify as bisexual, pansexual, omnisexual, biromantic, polysexual, or sexually fluid. Bisexual people are less likely than their lesbian and gay counterparts to be out of the closet. As a result, there is a lot of variation among the bisexual community in how important bisexual people find bisexuality or LGBT identity to their sense of self. Bisexual people may have social networks that are heavily concentrated inside the wider LGBT community; whether or not they participate in broader LGBT culture, bisexual people may also participate in bisexual-specific communities.

The bisexual community has bi-specific events and conferences; publications, such as Bi Women Quarterly; websites and organizations, like BiNet USA and the Bisexual Resource Center; magazines, such as Bi Community News; writer's groups; media, including the books Bi Any Other Name and Getting Bi; leaders and politicians, such as Robyn Ochs and Katie Hill; and mental health associations. Bisexual groups began forming in the 1980s in several cities.

These communities come together with the lesbian, gay, and transgender communities for bigger LGBT events such as LGBT pride parades, civil rights marches and advocacy, conferences, and other nationwide causes where the interests of the communities intersect, such as the National Equality March. Often, conferences have separate seminars on bisexual and transgender topics, and several LGBT pride parades now include special bisexual sections as well.

September 23 is Celebrate Bisexuality Day. The week beginning on the Sunday before Celebrate Bisexuality Day is Bisexual Awareness Week.

Discrimination

People who identify as bisexual can receive specifically directed hatred and distrust (biphobia), stereotyping, and denial (bisexual erasure) from people of all sexual orientations. People may say bisexuals are just unsure of their feelings or going through a "phase" and will or should "decide" or "discover" which sex they are attracted to. On the other hand, there is also increasing support, inclusion, and visibility of bisexuals in the LGBT community.

A series of groups have been working together and focusing on issues important to the bisexual community such as biphobia, dating, coming out, bisexual's visibility in the news and entertainment, and bisexual erasure. These groups are queer-identified and closely allied with the gay, lesbian, and transgender communities, but their main focus is the bisexual community. There has also been a movement to combat biphobia and myths about bisexuals.

Equality campaigns and pride celebrations

The National Equality March was a national political rally that occurred on October 11, 2009, in Washington, D.C. It called for equal protection for lesbian, gay, bisexual, and transgender people in all matters governed by civil law in all states and districts. The march was called for by LGBT activist Cleve Jones and organized by Equality Across America and the Courage Campaign. Kip Williams and Robin McGehee served as co-directors. This was the first national march in Washington, D.C., for LGBT rights since the 2000 Millennium March.

There was a specific bisexual, pansexual and queer-identified contingent that was organized to be a part of the march. Several bisexual, pansexual and queer-identified groups including BiNet USA, New York Area Bisexual Network, DC Bi Women and BiMA DC, came together and marched, showing bisexual, pansexual and queer solidarity. There were four out bisexual speakers at the National Equality March rally: Michael Huffington, Lady Gaga, Chloe Noble, and Penelope Williams.

In October 2009, LGBT activist Amy Andre was appointed as executive director of the San Francisco Pride Celebration Committee, making her San Francisco Pride's first bisexual woman of color executive director.

Conferences and conventions

There are several conferences and conventions for bi+ people. These include the International Conference on Bisexuality, BiCon (UK), and BECAUSE (Conference) in the United States. Several of these have produced offshoot research conferences on bisexuality, among them BiReCon in the UK, EuroBiReCon, and BiReConUSA in the United States.

See also
 Biphobia
 Biromantic
 Bisexual erasure
 Bisexuality
 Bisexuality in the United States
 Bisexual lighting
 History of bisexuality
 
 List of media portrayals of bisexuality
 Omnisexuality
 Pansexuality
 Polysexuality
 Sexual fluidity

References

Further reading

General
 Bi Any Other Name: Bisexual People Speak Out by Loraine Hutchins, editor & Lani Kaʻahumanu, editor 
 Getting Bi: Voices of Bisexuals Around the World by Robyn Ochs, editor & Sarah Rowley, editor 
 The Bisexual Option by Fritz Klein, 
 Bi America: Myths, Truths And Struggles Of An Invisible Community, William E. Burleson, 
 Bisexuality in the United States: A Social Science Reader, Paula C. Rodriguez Rust, editor 
 Bisexuality: The Psychology and Politics of an Invisible Minority by Beth A. Firestein, editor 
 Current Research on Bisexuality by Ronald C. Fox, editor

Magazines
Bi Women Quarterly
Bi Magazine (US)
Bi Community News (UK)
Bi Social Network (US)
Bi News Magazine (Netherlands)
The Fence (Canada)
Bi Women Boston (US)
Raspberry Mousse (US)

External links 

BiNet USA 
Bisexual Resource Center
American Institute of Bisexuality
Ambi
Bi Writers Association
New York Area Bisexual Network
Journal Of Bisexuality 
Mental Health In the Bi+ Community

Community
Types of communities
Pansexuality